The following is an alphabetical list of topics related to the Commonwealth of The Bahamas.

0–9
.bs – Internet country code top-level domain for the Bahamas
1926 Miami Hurricane
1928 Okeechobee Hurricane
1929 Bahamas hurricane
1932 Bahamas hurricane
1947 Fort Lauderdale Hurricane
2014 Bahamas Bowl
2015 Bahamas Bowl
2016 Bahamas Bowl
2017 Commonwealth Youth Games
2017 in The Bahamas

A
Aaron Cleare
Abaco Air
Abaco Independence Movement
Abaco Islands
Abraham's Bay
Acklins
Acklins and Crooked Islands
Afro-Bahamian
Agriculture in the Bahamas
Air Charter Bahamas
Airports in the Bahamas
Alex Smith, son of Ed Smith
Alice Town
Ambergris Cay
Americas
North America
Northern America
North Atlantic Ocean
West Indies
Lucayan Archipelago
Bahama Islands
Andrae Williams
Andros, Bahamas
Andros Central Airport
Andros Conservancy & Trust Bahamas
Andros Town
Andros Town International Airport
Anna Cay
Arawak Cay
Ardastra Gardens, Zoo and Conservation Centre
Area code 242
Arthur Dion Hanna
Arthur Foulkes
Arthur Hailey
Arthur's Town
Arthur's Town Airport
Athletics at the 2017 Commonwealth Youth Games
Athol Island
Atlantis Paradise Island
Atlas of the Bahamas
Autec Heliport
Avard Moncur

B
Baha Mar
Baha Men
Bahama Banks
Bahama Islands
Bahamas (magazine)
The Bahamas
Bahamasair
Bahamas Airline Pilots Association
Bahamas and the American Civil War
Bahamas Association of Athletic Associations
Bahamas at the 1958 British Empire and Commonwealth Games
Bahamas at the 1962 British Empire and Commonwealth Games
Bahamas at the 2010 Central American and Caribbean Games
Bahamas at the Commonwealth Games
Bahamas at the 2002 Commonwealth Games
Bahamas at the 2006 Commonwealth Games
Bahamas at the 2014 Commonwealth Games
Bahamas at the Olympics
Bahamas at the 1952 Summer Olympics
Bahamas at the 1956 Summer Olympics
Bahamas at the 1960 Summer Olympics
Bahamas at the 1964 Summer Olympics
Bahamas at the 1968 Summer Olympics
Bahamas at the 1972 Summer Olympics
Bahamas at the 1976 Summer Olympics
Bahamas at the 1984 Summer Olympics
Bahamas at the 1988 Summer Olympics
Bahamas at the 1992 Summer Olympics
Bahamas at the 1996 Summer Olympics
Bahamas at the 2000 Summer Olympics
Bahamas at the 2004 Summer Olympics
Bahamas at the 2008 Summer Olympics
Bahamas at the 2012 Summer Olympics
Bahamas at the 2016 Summer Olympics
Bahamas at the 1972 Summer Paralympics
Bahamas at the 1976 Summer Paralympics
Bahamas at the 1980 Summer Paralympics
Bahamas at the 2010 Summer Youth Olympics
Bahamas at the 2014 Summer Youth Olympics
Bahamas at the Pan American Games
Bahamas at the 1979 Pan American Games
Bahamas at the 1983 Pan American Games
Bahamas at the 1987 Pan American Games
Bahamas at the 1991 Pan American Games
Bahamas at the 1995 Pan American Games
Bahamas at the 1999 Pan American Games
Bahamas at the 2003 Pan American Games
Bahamas at the 2007 Pan American Games
Bahamas at the 2011 Pan American Games
Bahamas at the 2015 Pan American Games
Bahamas at the Paralympics 
Bahamas at the 1984 Summer Paralympics
Bahamas at the 1988 Summer Paralympics
Bahamas at the 2011 World Aquatics Championships
Bahamas at the 2013 World Aquatics Championships
Bahamas at the 2015 World Aquatics Championships
Bahamas at the 2017 World Aquatics Championships
Bahamas at the World Championships in Athletics
Bahamas at the 2009 World Championships in Athletics
Bahamas at the 2011 World Championships in Athletics
Bahamas at the 2013 World Championships in Athletics
Bahamas at the 2015 World Championships in Athletics
Bahamas at the 2017 World Championships in Athletics
Bahamas Bowl
Bahamas–China relations
Bahamas Cricket Association
Bahamas Crisis Centre
Bahamas–Cuba relations
Bahamas Customs Service
Bahamas Democratic Movement
Bahamas Davis Cup team
Bahamas Electricity Corporation
Bahamas Fed Cup team
Bahamas Football Association
Bahamas Hotel, Catering and Allied Workers Union
Bahamas Institute of Chartered Accountants
Bahamas International
Bahamas International Film Festival
Bahamas Maritime Authority
Bahamas men's national softball team
Bahamas Ministry of Tourism
Bahamas national baseball team
Bahamas national basketball team
Bahamas national beach soccer team
Bahamas national cricket team
Bahamas national football team
Bahamas national football team results
Bahamas National Open
Bahamas national rugby sevens team
Bahamas national rugby union team
Bahamas National Trust
Bahamas national under-17 basketball team
Bahamas national under-19 basketball team
Bahamas Olympic Committee
Bahamas President's Cup
Bahamas Reef Environmental Educational Foundation
Bahamas Securities Exchange
Bahamas Speed Week
Bahamas Taxi Cab Union
Bahamasair
Bahamas-Nantucket Hurricane of 1932
Bahamian Americans
Bahamian constitutional referendum, 2016
Bahamian Creole
Bahamian cuisine
Bahamian Democratic Party
Bahamian diplomatic missions
Bahamian dollar
Bahamian English
Bahamian gambling referendum, 2013
Bahamian general election, 1833
Bahamian general election, 1935
Bahamian general election, 1949
Bahamian general election, 1956
Bahamian general election, 1962
Bahamian general election, 1967
Bahamian general election, 1968
Bahamian general election, 1972
Bahamian general election, 1982
Bahamian general election, 1977
Bahamian general election, 1987
Bahamian general election, 1992
Bahamian general election, 1997 
Bahamian general election, 2002
Bahamian general election, 2007 
Bahamian general election, 2012
Bahamian general election, 2017
Bahamian passport
Bahamian pound
Bahamians
Bahamian Rhyming Spiritual
Baker's Bay Golf & Ocean Club
Banknotes of the Bank of Nassau (Bahamas)
BaTelCo (Bahamas)
Battle of Nassau
Bears FC
Berry Islands
BFA Senior League
Bibliography of the Bahamas
Big Whale Cay Airport
Bimini
Bimini Road
Bishop of Nassau and The Bahamas
Black Point
Black Point Airport
Blue Lagoon Island
Brent Symonette
British Colonial Hilton Nassau
BTC (Bahamas)

C
Cabinet of the Bahamas
Cape Eleuthera Airport
Cape Santa Maria Airport
Capital of the Bahamas:  Nassau on New Providence
Capital punishment in the Bahamas
Capture of the Bahamas (1782)
Capture of the Bahamas (1783)
Cargill Creek
Caribbean
Caribbean Community (CARICOM)
Castaway Cay
Castaway Cay Airport
Castle Bank & Trust (Bahamas)
Cat Cays
Cat Cays Airport
Cat Island (Bahamas)
Categories:
:Category:Bahamas
:Category:Bahamas stubs
:Category:Bahamas-related lists
:Category:Bahamian culture
:Category:Bahamian people
:Category:Buildings and structures in the Bahamas
:Category:Communications in the Bahamas
:Category:Economy of the Bahamas
:Category:Education in the Bahamas
:Category:Environment of the Bahamas
:Category:Geography of the Bahamas
:Category:Government of the Bahamas
:Category:Health in the Bahamas
:Category:History of the Bahamas
:Category:Military of the Bahamas
:Category:Politics of the Bahamas
:Category:Science and technology in the Bahamas
:Category:Society of the Bahamas
:Category:Sport in the Bahamas
:Category:Transport in the Bahamas
commons:Category:Bahamas
Catholic Church in the Bahamas
Cavalier FC 
Cay Sal
Cay Sal Airport
Cay Sal Bank
Central Abaco
Central Andros
Central Bank of The Bahamas
Central Eleuthera
Chandra Sturrup
Chief Councillor
Chief Justice of the Bahamas
Chris Brown (athlete)
Christine Amertil
Chub Cay
Chub Cay International Airport
Cistern Field
Cities in the Bahamas
Clarence A. Bain Airport
Clarence Town
Clifford Darling
Coakley Cay
Coat of arms of the Bahamas
College of the Bahamas
Colonel Hill
Colonel Hill Airport
Colonial Heads of the Bahamas
Commando Squadron (Bahamas)
Commonwealth Labour Party (Bahamas)
Commonwealth of Nations
Commonwealth of the Bahamas
Commonwealth of the Bahamas Trade Union Congress
Commonwealth realm of the Bahamas
Communications in the Bahamas
Companies of the Bahamas
Compass Point Studios
Conception Island, Bahamas
Conception Island National Park
Conch (people)
Congo Town
R.E. Cooper, Sr. (Baptist Clergy and Civil Rights Activist)
Coopers Town
Cornishtown
COVID-19 pandemic in the Bahamas
Craig Hepburn
Cricket in the Bahamas
Crooked Island (Bahamas)
Crown Haven
Culture of the Bahamas
Cutlass Bay Airport

D
Darby Island Airport
Deadman's Cay Airport
Dean's Blue Hole
Debbie Ferguson
Deep Creek (Bahamas)
Deep Water Cay Airport
Democratic National Alliance (Bahamas)
Demographics of the Bahamas
Dennis Darling
Devard Darling
Diocese of The Bahamas and the Turks and Caicos Islands
Districts of the Bahamas
Dolly's Cay
Dominic Demeritte
Dolphin Encounters
Drug Enforcement Unit
Duncan Town Airport
Dunmore Town

E
East Grand Bahama
Economy of the Bahamas
Ed Smith, first Bahamian to play in the NFL
Education in the Bahamas
Effects of Hurricane Andrew in The Bahamas
Effects of Hurricane Wilma in The Bahamas
Egg Island (Bahamas)
Elbow Cay
Elbow Cays
Eldece Clarke-Lewis
Elections in the Bahamas
Eleuthera
Eleutheran Adventurers
Embassy of the Bahamas in Washington, D.C.
English colonization of the Americas
English language
Eric Gibson
Exuma
Exuma Cays Land and Sea Park
Exuma International Airport

F

Farmers Cay Airport
Garet 'Tiger' Finlayson
Flag of the Bahamas
Football in the Bahamas
Foreign relations of the Bahamas
Fort Charlotte (Nassau)
Fort Fincastle
Fowl Cay Airport
Frank Rutherford
Free National Movement
Freeport F.C.
Freeport Jet Wash Jets
Freeport, Bahamas
Freetown, Bahamas
Fresh Creek
Friends of the Environment

G
Gary White (footballer)
Geography of the Bahamas
George Town Airport
God Bless our Sunny Clime
Goombay Punch
Goose River (Bahamas)
Government House, The Bahamas
Governor-General of the Bahamas
Governor's Harbour Airport
Grand Bahama Football League
Grand Bahama Aux AF Airport
Grand Bahama International Airport
Grand Bahama Stadium
Grand Bahama
Grand Cay
Great Guana Cay
Great Harbour Cay
Great Harbour Cay Airport
Great Isaac Cay, Bahamas
Great Stirrup Cay
Greek Bahamians
Green Turtle Cay
Grotto Beach Formation
Guanahani
Gun Cay

H
Harbour Island
Hard Bargain Airport
Hawk Creek (Bahamas)
Hawks Nest Airport
Heads of Government of the Bahamas
Buddy Hield
High Commission of The Bahamas, London
High Rock
History of the Bahamas
Hog Cay Airport
Hogsty Reef
Hope Town
Hubert Ingraham
Human trafficking in the Bahamas
Hunter, Grand Bahama
Hurricane Andrew
Hurricane Betsy (1956)
Hurricane Betsy
Hurricane David
Hurricane Dorian
Hurricane Gracie
Hurricane Hortense
Hurricane Inez
Hurricane Joaquin
Hurricane Lili (1996)

I
Illegal drug trade in the Bahamas
Inagua
Inagua Airport
Inagua National Park
International Organization for Standardization (ISO)
ISO 3166-1 alpha-2 country code for the Bahamas: BS
ISO 3166-1 alpha-3 country code for the Bahamas: BHS
ISO 3166-2:BS region codes for the Bahamas
Iron Cay
Islands of the Bahamas
Ivy Dumont

J
Jewfish Cay
Joe Lewis (British businessman)
Joseph Spence
Joulter Cays
Judiciary of the Bahamas
Junkanoo
Jwycesska Island
Kemps Bay

L
Labour Party (Bahamas)
Laker Airways (Bahamas)
Laverne Eve
Law of the Bahamas
Leaf Cay Airport
Lee Stocking Airport
Leevan Sands
LGBT rights in the Bahamas (Gay rights)
Lighthouse Point, Bahamas
Lisbon Creek
Lists related to the Bahamas:
List of airlines of the Bahamas
List of airports in the Bahamas
List of Bahamas-related topics
List of Bahamian flags
List of Bahamian musicians
List of Bahamians
List of birds of the Bahamas
List of cathedrals in the Bahamas
List of cities in the Bahamas
List of companies of the Bahamas
List of defunct airlines of the Bahamas
List of diplomatic missions in The Bahamas
List of flag bearers for the Bahamas at the Olympics
List of football clubs in Bahamas
List of governors of the Bahamas
List of Governors-General of the Bahamas
List of heads of state of the Bahamas
List of hospitals in Bahamas
List of islands of the Bahamas
List of islands of the Bahamas by total area
List of lighthouses in the Bahamas
List of mammals of the Bahamas
List of museums in the Bahamas
List of newspapers in the Bahamas
List of people on the postage stamps of the Bahamas
List of political parties in the Bahamas
List of presidents of the Senate of the Bahamas
List of rivers of the Bahamas
List of speakers of the House of Assembly of the Bahamas
List of television stations in the Bahamas by call sign
List of universities in the Bahamas
Topic outline of the Bahamas
Little Darby Island Airport
Little Grassy Creek
Little Inagua
Little San Salvador Island
Little Stirrup Cay
Little Whale Cay
Local government in the Bahamas
Loggerhead Creek
Long Cay
Long Island, Bahamas
Lt. Whale Cay Airport
Lucaya, Bahamas
Lucayan Archipelago
Lucayan people
Lyford Cay
Lyford Cay FC 
Lynden Pindling International Airport

M
Mack Town
Man Island (Bahamas)
Mangrove Cay
Man-O-War Cay
March On, Bahamaland
Mark Knowles
Marsh Harbour
Marsh Harbour Airport
Mary Star of the Sea Church, Freeport
Matthew Town
Mayaguana
Mayaguana Airport
Military of the Bahamas
Milo Butler
Minister of Foreign Affairs (Bahamas)
Ministry of Foreign Affairs (Bahamas)
Ministry of Health and Social Development (Bahamas)
Ministry of National Security (Bahamas)
Ministry of Public Works and Transport (Bahamas)
Miss Teen USA
Mister Bahamas
Monarchy of the Bahamas
Mores Island Airport
Moore's Island
Mouchoir Bank
Mount Alvernia
Mount Creek
Musha Cay
Music of The Bahamas (docu-musical)
Music of the Bahamas

N
Nassau on New Providence – Capital of the Bahamas
Template:Nassau TV
Nassau Hurricane of 1926
Nassau Public Library
Nassau Stadium
Nathaniel McKinney
National Art Gallery of The Bahamas
National Congress of Trade Unions
National Development Party (Bahamas)
New Bight Airport
New Providence
New Providence Airport
New Providence Football League
Nicholls Town
Nichollstown and Berry Islands
Norman's Cay
Norman's Cay Airport
North Abaco
North America
North Andros
North Atlantic Ocean
North Bimini Airport
North Eleuthera
North Eleuthera Airport
North Temperate Zone and Tropics
Northern America
Northern Hemisphere

O
O'Brien Cay
Ocean Cay Airport
Official Gazette The Bahamas
Old Fort of Nassau
Order of Merit of the Bahamas
Orville Alton Turnquest
Out Islands

P
Paradise Island
Parliament of the Bahamas
Pauline Davis-Thompson
Pelican Creek
Perry Christie
Pig Beach
Sir Lynden Oscar Pindling
Pineapple Air
Pitts Town Airport
Plana Cays
Pledge of Allegiance (Bahamas)
Politics of the Bahamas
Port Nelson Airport
Postage stamps and postal history of the Bahamas
President of the Court of Appeal of the Bahamas
Prime Minister of the Bahamas
Princess Cays
Progressive Liberal Party
Public holidays in the Bahamas

Q
Queen's College, Nassau
Queen’s Staircase - Nassau

R
Ragged Island
Raid on Charles Town
Raid on Nassau
Rainbow Alliance of The Bahamas
Rake-and-scrape
Religion in the Bahamas
Republic of Pirates
Resorts World Bimini
Rick Fox
Ripsaw music
River Lees
Robert Sweeting (politician)
Rock Sound, Bahamas
Rock Sound International Airport
Roger Smith (tennis player)
Roland Theodore Symonette
Roman Catholic Archdiocese of Nassau
Roscow A. L. Davies Soccer Field
Rose Island, Bahamas
Royal Bahamas Defence Force
Royal Bahamas Police Force
Rudder Cut Cay Airport
Rugby union in the Bahamas
Rum Cay

S
Samana Cay
Sampson Cay Airport
San Andros Airport
San Salvador Island
San Salvador and Rum Cay
San Salvador Island
Sandy Creek (Bahamas)
Sandy Point, Bahamas
Sandy Point Airport
Sapodilla Creek
Savatheda Fynes
Scotland Cay Airport
The Scout Association of the Bahamas
Scouting and Guiding in the Bahamas
Seal Cay
Sebastian Bach
Serranilla Bank
Sidney Poitier
Simon Creek
SkyBahamas Airlines
Snug Corner
Somerset Creek
South Abaco
South Andros
South Andros Airport
South Bimini Airport
South Eleuthera
Southern Air Charter
Spanish Cay Airport
Spanish Wells
Spring City, Bahamas
Spring Point Airport
St. Andrews Presbyterian Kirk
St Andrew's School (Bahamas)
St. Augustine's College (Bahamas)
St. Francis Xavier Cathedral, Nassau
Stafford Creek
Stafford Sands
Staniard Creek
Staniel Cay
Staniel Cay Airport
Starve Creek
Stella Maris Airport
Stocking Island
Supreme Court of the Bahamas

T
Tarpum Bay
Telecommunications in the Bahamas
Television in the Bahamas
Television stations in the Bahamas by call sign
The Bahamas Great Abaco Classic
The Bahamas Great Exuma Classic
The Bahamas–India relations
The Bahamas Local Government Act 1996
The Bluff, Bahamas
The Island School
The Scout Association of the Bahamas
Thomas Robinson Stadium
Mychal Thompson
Timber Creek (Bahamas)
Tongue of the Ocean
Tonique Williams-Darling
Tour of the Bahamas
Town & Country Predators
Transport in the Bahamas
Treasure Cay
Treasure Cay Airport
Trevor Harvey (basketball)
Tropic of Cancer
Tropics and North Temperate Zone
Troy Kemp
Troy McIntosh

U
United Nations, member state since 1973
United States Ambassador to the Bahamas
University of the Bahamas

V
Vanguard Party
Viktor Kožený
Visa policy of Bahamas
Visa requirements for Bahamian citizens

W
Walker's Cay
Walker's Cay Airport
West End Airport
West End, Grand Bahama 
West Grand Bahama
West Indies
Western Air
Western Hemisphere

Wikipedia:WikiProject Topic outline/Drafts/Topic outline of the Bahamas
Windermere Island
Workers' Party (Bahamas)

Z
ZNS-1
ZNS-TV

See also

Commonwealth of Nations
List of international rankings
Lists of country-related topics
Outline of geography
Outline of North America
Outline of the Bahamas
United Nations

References

External links
 

 
Bahamas